The 2008 West Virginia Republican presidential caucuses took place on  February 5, 2008 to select 18 delegates to the 2008 Republican National Convention.  An additional nine delegates were selected in a primary election on May 13, 2008, for a total of 27 delegates to the national convention.  Mike Huckabee won the caucuses, and John McCain later won the primary.

Romney entered the caucus with the most pledged convention-goers, but delegates for McCain defected to Huckabee.  In the first round of caucusing, the results were Romney 464, Huckabee 375, McCain 176, Paul 118, Giuliani 0.  Since no candidate had a majority, Giuliani dropped out and the delegates took a second vote.  At this second vote, most Paul and McCain supporters, reportedly acting on commands from their coordinators, shifted to Huckabee, ensuring him the majority.  As a result of a deal with Huckabee's camp, Paul's delegates swung to Huckabee in exchange for 3 of the State's 18 national delegates.

The West Virginia caucus was the first of the 21 "Super Tuesday" contests to be counted, with the results being reported in the mid-afternoon.  Huckabee's win over the favored Romney was considered a major loss of momentum for Romney's campaign, while it revitalized Mike Huckabee's hopes for the nomination.

In the primary election, three delegates were awarded for each of West Virginia's three congressional districts.  The winner in each district was awarded all three of that district's delegates.  McCain, the presumptive nominee, easily won all three districts.

Results

February 5 Caucus

 As a result of the deal between Huckabee and Paul's delegates, 3 of the State's 18 delegates went to Ron Paul, although the election was technically a "winner-take-all."

May 13 primary

*Candidate suspended campaign prior to this primary

See also
 Republican Party (United States) presidential primaries, 2008
 West Virginia Democratic primary, 2008

References

West Virginia
Republican presidential caucuses and primary
West Virginia Republican presidential caucuses and primary
West Virginia Republican presidential caucuses and primary
West Virginia Republican primaries